Michael Tiemann is an American software developer and executive, serving as vice president of open source affairs at Red Hat, Inc., and former President of the Open Source Initiative.

Biography
He earned a bachelor's degree from the Moore School of  Electrical Engineering in 1986 at the University of Pennsylvania.

He co-founded Cygnus Solutions in 1989. His programming contributions to free software include authorship of the GNU C++ compiler and work on the GNU C compiler and the GNU Debugger. Tiemann is featured in the 2001 documentary Revolution OS. Opensource.com profiled him in 2014, calling him one of "open source's great explainers."

He was the chief technical officer of Red Hat. He  served on a number of boards, including the Embedded Linux Consortium, the GNOME Foundation advisory board, and the board of directors of ActiveState Tool Corp.

References

External links

 Michael Tiemann's Home Page

Free software programmers
Linux people
Living people
Year of birth missing (living people)
Members of the Open Source Initiative board of directors
Open source advocates
Red Hat people
University of Pennsylvania School of Engineering and Applied Science alumni